Bradley de Villiers (born 4 December 1997) is a South African cricketer. He made his first-class debut for South Western Districts in the 2017–18 Sunfoil 3-Day Cup on 1 February  2018. He made his List A debut for South Western Districts in the 2017–18 CSA Provincial One-Day Challenge on 4 February 2018.

In September 2018, he was named in South Western Districts' squad for the 2018 Africa T20 Cup.

References

External links
 

1997 births
Living people
South African cricketers
South Western Districts cricketers
Place of birth missing (living people)